Cyclosurus is a genus of small, air-breathing, land snails with an operculum, terrestrial pulmonate gastropod molluscs in the family Cyclophoridae.

Species 
Species in the genus Cyclosurus include:
 Cyclosurus mariei

References

Cyclophoridae
Taxonomy articles created by Polbot